The Oklahoma State System of Higher Education is the state's legal structure for providing public education at the collegiate level. It is a coordinated system of colleges and universities located throughout the state.

State System overview 
With a current enrollment of more than 247,000 students, the State System consists of 25 colleges and universities (including 2 research universities, 11 regional universities, and 12 community colleges), 11 constituent agencies, and one higher education center. The State System is coordinated by the Oklahoma State Regents for Higher Education, and each institution is governed by a board of regents. There are currently three constitutional boards of regents that govern a majority of colleges and universities in the state: the OSU/A&M Board of Regents, the University of Oklahoma Board of Regents, and the Regional University System of Oklahoma (RUSO). In addition, there are 12 statutory boards of regents that govern specific community colleges in the state.

Research universities 

Research universities governed by the OSU/A&M Board of Regents
 Oklahoma State University
Research universities governed by the University of Oklahoma Board of Regents
 University of Oklahoma

Regional universities 

Regional universities governed by the Board of Regents for the Oklahoma Agricultural and Mechanical Colleges
 Langston University
 Oklahoma Panhandle State University
Regional universities governed by the University of Oklahoma Board of Regents
 Cameron University
 Rogers State University
Regional universities governed by the Regional University System of Oklahoma
 East Central University
 Northeastern State University
 Northwestern Oklahoma State University
 Southeastern Oklahoma State University
 Southwestern Oklahoma State University
 University of Central Oklahoma
Regional university governed by the Board of Regents of the University of Science & Arts of Oklahoma
 University of Science and Arts of Oklahoma

Community colleges 

Community colleges governed by OSU/A&M Board of Regents
 Connors State College
 Northeastern Oklahoma A&M College
Community colleges governed by a college-specific statutory governing board
 Carl Albert State College
 Eastern Oklahoma State College
 Murray State College
 Northern Oklahoma College
 Oklahoma City Community College
 Redlands Community College
 Rose State College
 Seminole State College
 Tulsa Community College
 Western Oklahoma State College

Constituent agencies 

Constituent agencies of Oklahoma State University
 OSU-Oklahoma City
 OSU-Tulsa
OSU Agricultural Experiment Station
 OSU Center for Health Sciences 
 OSU College of Veterinary Medicine
 OSU Cooperative Extension Service 
 OSU Institute of Technology, Okmulgee 
Constituent agencies of the University of Oklahoma
 OU - Tulsa
OU Geological Survey 
 OU Health Sciences Center 
 OU Law Center

Higher education programs/sites 

 Greater Oklahoma City Downtown Consortium
 Langston University, Oklahoma City
 Northern Oklahoma College, Stillwater
 University Center at Ponca City
University Center of Southern Oklahoma

References 

Public education in Oklahoma
1941 establishments in Oklahoma